Borremans is a Belgian surname. Notable people with the surname include:

Charles Borremans (1769–1827), Flemish/Dutch composer
Colonel Borremans Belgian military commander
Guglielmo Borremans (born 1672), Flemish painter
Guilielmus Borremans, 17th-century Flemish choir-master and composer
Jean Borremans (1911–1968), Belgian minister after World War II
Joseph Borremans (1775–1858), Flemish/Dutch composer
Laurence Borremans (born 1978), former Miss Belgium
Nicolaes Borremans (c. 1614–1679), Dutch poet and editor
Michaël Borremans (born 1963), Belgian painter
Raymond Borremans (1906–1988), French musician, globe-trotter and encyclopaedist

Dutch-language surnames
Surnames of Belgian origin